The 2022 NHL Heritage Classic (branded as the 2022 Tim Hortons NHL Heritage Classic for sponsorship reasons) was an outdoor regular season National Hockey League (NHL) game. The game, the sixth Heritage Classic, was held on March 13, 2022, between the Buffalo Sabres and the Toronto Maple Leafs at Tim Hortons Field in Hamilton, Ontario. After falling behind 2–1, the Sabres scored four unanswered goals to defeat the Maple Leafs, 5–2.

Background
The league announced the game on September 16, 2021. Hamilton, Ontario, was chosen due to its location in the Golden Horseshoe midway between Buffalo and Toronto. This was Toronto's first Heritage Classic appearance, and Buffalo became the first U.S. team to both compete in and host a Heritage Classic.

Game summary

Number in parenthesis represents the player's total in goals or assists to that point of the season

Team rosters

 Erik Källgren and Dustin Tokarski dressed as the back-up goaltenders.  Neither entered the game.

Scratches
Toronto Maple Leafs: Travis Dermott, Kyle Clifford, Nick Robertson
Buffalo Sabres: Mark Jankowski, Casey Fitzgerald, Anders Bjork

Attendance
The 2022 Heritage Classic was the lowest attended NHL outdoor game with 26,119 spectators.

Entertainment
Country pop singer Lindsay Ell performed the Canadian and American national anthems and singer Alessia Cara performed during the first intermission. The Canadian Olympic women's ice hockey team, the gold medal winners at the 2022 Winter Olympics, were honoured during the second intermission. This game marks the first time that the bilingual version of O Canada was sung at the Heritage Classic.

Television
The game was broadcast on Sportsnet and TVA Sports in Canada and on TNT in the U.S.

References

External links

NHL Heritage Classic
Heritage Classic
Buffalo Sabres games
Ice hockey competitions in Hamilton, Ontario
Toronto Maple Leafs games
Heritage Classic
Heritage Classic